The All-NBL Canada Team is an annual National Basketball League of Canada honor given to the best players in the league following every NBLC season. It has been presented to a total of fifteen players, divided into three separate five-man lineups, since 2012–13. In the 2011–12 NBL Canada season, the third team was not included. Anthony Anderson holds the record for the most first-team selections, with three. He is followed by Brandon Robinson, who has been named to two such teams.

Selections

References 

National Basketball League of Canada awards